
Gmina Żmigród is an urban-rural gmina (administrative district) in Trzebnica County, Lower Silesian Voivodeship, in south-western Poland. It is part of the Wrocław metropolitan area.

The Test Track Centre near Żmigród is situated here.

Neighbouring gminas
Gmina Żmigród is bordered by the gminas of Milicz, Prusice, Rawicz, Trzebnica, Wąsosz and Wińsko.

Villages
Apart from the town of Żmigród, the gmina contains the villages of Barkowo, Borek, Borzęcin, Bychowo, Chodlewo, Dębno, Dobrosławice, Garbce, Gatka, Grądzik, Kanclerzowice, Karnice, Kaszyce Milickie, Kędzie, Kliszkowice, Korzeńsko, Książęca Wieś, Łapczyce, Laskowa, Morzęcino, Niezgoda, Osiek, Powidzko, Przedkowice, Przywsie, Radziądz, Ruda Żmigrodzka, Sanie, Węglewo and Żmigródek.

Twin towns – sister cities

Gmina Żmigród is twinned with:
 Bargteheide, Germany

References

Zmigrod
Trzebnica County